The 1st Aviation Brigade is an aviation brigade of the British Army. Most of its units are from the Army Air Corps (AAC). It was stood up on 1 April 2020 by combining the Wattisham Flying Station Headquarters (WFS HQ), formerly the Attack Helicopter Force (AHF) at Wattisham and the Aviation Reconnaissance Force at the Royal Naval Air Station Yeovilton. It will reach initial operating capability on 1 April 2021 and full operating capability by 1 January 2023.

Structure
As of May 2021 the units of the brigade are as follows:

 Headquarters, 1st Aviation Brigade, at AAC Middle Wallop
 1 Regiment Army Air Corps, at RNAS Yeovilton (Aviation Reconnaissance, equipped with AgustaWestland AW159 Wildcat)
 3 Regiment Army Air Corps, at Wattisham Flying Station (Aviation Attack, equipped with AgustaWestland Apaches)
 4 Regiment Army Air Corps, at Wattisham Flying Station (Aviation Attack, equipped with AgustaWestland Apaches)
 5 Regiment Army Air Corps, at Joint Helicopter Command Flying Station Aldergrove, Aldergrove (Northern Ireland aviation support, equipped with Aérospatiale Gazelles)
 6 Regiment Army Air Corps (Army Reserve), at Blenheim Camp, Bury St Edmunds (Ground Crew Reserve)
 47 Regiment Royal Artillery, at Larkhill operating Watchkeeper Unmanned Air Systems, since April 2021.
 No. 653 Squadron, Army Air Corps, at Wattisham Flying Station (Conversion Training Unit)
 7 Aviation Support Battalion REME, Royal Electrical and Mechanical Engineers, at Wattisham Flying Station
 132 Aviation Support Squadron, Royal Logistic Corps

See also

 List of Army Air Corps aircraft units

Footnotes

References 
 

Brigades of the British Army
Aviation units and formations of the British Army
Army aviation brigades
Military units and formations established in 2020
2020 establishments in the United Kingdom